Jalan Utama Bera, Federal Route 1510, is a federal road in Pahang, Malaysia. It is a main route to Sebertak, Kota Bahagia, Bandar Muadzam Shah and Tasik Bera. At most sections, the Federal Route 1510 was built under the JKR R5 road standard, allowing maximum speed limit of up to 90 km/h.

List of junctions

Main roads

Jalan Bukit Kepayang side

Malaysian Federal Roads